Jeffrey Harold Perry (13 October 1948 – 4 February 2012) was an English stage and screen actor. Born in Barrow-in-Furness, Lancashire and trained at the Guildhall School of Music and Drama, he worked extensively for the Royal Exchange in Manchester. He may be best known to television audiences as Mr. Tumnus in the 1988 version of The Lion, the Witch, and the Wardrobe, which was part of the BBC's Chronicles of Narnia TV miniseries.

In the 2000s, Perry's work included performances at the Mill at Sonning. In the summer of 2008, he played Mr. Mole in Love's a Luxury. He was also a director of NOT The National Theatre and toured with them, appearing in several productions.

Selected stage and screen credits

Television
The Lion, the Witch, and the Wardrobe (as Mr. Tumnus), 1988
Micawber (as Clerk), 2001

Theatre
Hard Times, NOT The National Theatre, 1990-1991
Playing Sinatra (as Norman), NOT The National Theatre, 1999
Time and Time Again (as Leonard), The Mill at Sonning
All for Mary (as Humphrey Millar), The Mill at Sonning, 2001
Hysteria (as Sigmund Freud), NOT The National Theatre, 2002
Strictly Murder (as Josef), The Mill at Sonning, 2006
Love's a Luxury (as Mr. Mole), The Mill at Sonning, 2008

Death
Jeffrey Perry was found dead at home in Stanhoe, Norfolk, by his wife on 4 February 2012. He was 63 years old. An inquest three months later recorded a verdict of suicide; Perry had poisoned himself with chemicals and placed a plastic bag over his head.

References

External links

Review of Love's a Luxury at The Stage, retrieved 3 July 2008
Review of Love's a Luxury at The Oxford Times, retrieved 3 July 2008

1948 births
2012 deaths
English male film actors
English male television actors
English male stage actors
Male actors from Lancashire
People from Barrow-in-Furness
Alumni of the Guildhall School of Music and Drama
20th-century English male actors
21st-century English male actors
2012 suicides
Suicides by poison
Suicides by asphyxiation
Suicides in England